Or is a collaborative album by Swiss musician Golden Boy and French singer and DJ Miss Kittin. It was released in Austria, Germany and Switzerland on 13 August 2001 by Ladomat 2000 and internationally on 23 March 2002 by Illustrious Records in the United Kingdom and Emperor Norton Records in the United States. The album includes the successful club single "Rippin Kittin" and a cover of "Campari Soda".

The tracks "Nix" and "It's Good for You to Meet People Like Us" were both included in the 2003 racing video game Midnight Club II.

Singles
"Rippin Kittin" was released as the first single on the album in 2001 in Germany, and on 26 August 2002 internationally. The song topped the UK Dance Chart and was placed at number 435 on Pitchfork list of the Top 500 Tracks of the 2000s.

Track listing

Personnel
Credits adapted from the liner notes of Or.

 Stefan Altenburger – production
 Miss Kittin – vocals on "Autopilot", "Rippin Kittin" and "Kopfstand"
 Bernd Steinwedel – mastering at Studio-Nord-Bremen (Bremen, Germany)
 Rike Weiger – cover
 Anne-Lise Coste – illustration

References

2001 debut albums
Miss Kittin albums
Collaborative albums